The 1914 United States Senate election in Ohio was held on November 3, 1914. Republican nominee Warren G. Harding, future President of the United States, defeated Democratic nominee Timothy S. Hogan and Progressive Arthur L. Garford to succeed retiring incumbent Republican Senator Theodore E. Burton.

Republican primary

Candidates
Ralph D. Cole, former U.S. Representative
Warren G. Harding, former State Senator and Lieutenant Governor of Ohio
Joseph B. Foraker, former Governor of Ohio and U.S. Senator

Campaign
Harding was initially not interested in a campaign for U.S. Senate, having been dissuaded by the divisive factionalism between the conservative and progressive wings of the Republican party which materialized during the 1912 elections. Harry Daugherty, an Ohio political boss, had entertained running for the seat himself, prompted by incumbent Senator Theodore Burton's plans to retire upon the expiration of his term, but party leaders advised him not to run. Instead, Daugherty unsuccessfully attempted to stage a draft movement to convince Harding to run for the seat. In spite of the unsuccessful draft effort, Florence Harding herself convinced her husband to mount a campaign following the death of her father, Amos Kling. The personal circumstances underlying this development are not known, but some in Marion, the Hardings' home town, speculated that former state senator and lieutenant governor Harding had agreed not to seek higher office as part of a reuniting "truce" between Florence and her father, or that Kling had advised Harding that it would behoove Harding to further his business rather than run for further public office.

Although Daugherty claimed it was him who had convinced Harding to run for United States Senate, Harding's friend and attorney Hoke Donithen, who eventually became Harding's campaign manager, may have played a role in the decision. Retiring Senator Theodore Burton also claimed credit, alleging to a biographer that Daugherty had not acquiesced in lending his support to Harding until after learning that the outgoing senator had backed him.

The Republican primary was a three-way contest, between Harding, Harding's former mentor and former U.S. Senator Joseph B. Foraker and Ralph Cole. Rather than campaigning directly against, and attempting to overtly differentiate himself from, Foraker and Cole, Harding notably employed a strategy of maintaining old, and forging new, alliances within the Republican party, to the chagrin of both of his opponents. At one point during the primary campaign, Cole asked, "If [Harding] is not going to fight someone, why did he enter the contest?" Harding eventually defeated both of his opponents in the primary, garnering 88,540 votes. Foraker finished in second with 76,817 votes, ahead of Cole with 52,237.

Results

General election

Campaign
In the general election campaign, Harding faced Democratic nominee Timothy Hogan, Progressive candidate Arthur Garford, and Socialist E.K. Hitchens. Hogan was the target of anti-Catholic sentiment amongst a large segment of voters; though Harding himself did not appear to outwardly embrace it during the course of the election, some of his supporters accused Hogan of wanting to "deliver Ohio to the Pope." Again favoring a conciliatory public stance, Harding also downplayed World War I as a campaign issue, which had begun in earnest months prior to the election, due to Ohio's significant German immigrant population.

Harding ultimately won the election and subsequently became the first United States Senator from Ohio to be popularly elected, following the ratification of the 17th Amendment to the Constitution. Harding's election to the United States Senate fueled speculation that he would again seek higher office, including the Presidency, though Harding himself did not publicly indicate any imminent interest in doing so; Harding had instead told family and friends, after being elected to the Senate, that he planned to return to his previous career in newspaper publishing at The Marion Daily Star after serving his term. Harding served in the Senate from 1921 until going on to be elected the 29th President of the United States in the 1920 election, and served as President until his death in office in August 1923.

Results

See also
1914 United States Senate elections
List of United States senators from Ohio

References

Ohio
1914
United States Senate
Warren G. Harding